The 1956 Oregon gubernatorial special election took place on November 6, 1956. Democratic state senator Robert D. Holmes narrowly defeated Republican incumbent Elmo Smith to win the election.

Background
On January 31, 1956, Governor Paul L. Patterson, who was elected in the 1954 gubernatorial election, died in office of a coronary occlusion. Patterson's death elevated Oregon State Senate President Elmo Smith to governor and a special election for November was called to fill the position for the final two years of Patterson's term. The succession law was changed in 1972 so that the Oregon Secretary of State is first in line to succeed the governor.
Lew Wallace unsuccessfully sought the Democratic nomination.

Election results

References

1956
Gubernatorial
Oregon
Gubernatorial 1956
Oregon 1956
November 1956 events in the United States